Glanford and Scunthorpe was a parliamentary constituency centred on the borough of Glanford and the town of Scunthorpe in Humberside.  It returned one Member of Parliament (MP)  to the House of Commons of the Parliament of the United Kingdom.

History
The constituency was created for the 1983 general election, and abolished for the 1997 general election. It was held by the Conservative Party in 1983, and gained by the Labour Party in 1987. Labour then held the seat until its abolition.

Boundaries
The Borough of Scunthorpe, and the Borough of Glanford wards of Bottesford Central, Bottesford East, Bottesford West, Broughton, Burton upon Stather, Gunness, Messingham, North West, Trentside, and Winterton.

Members of Parliament

Elections

Elections in the 1980s

Elections in the 1990s

See also 
 List of parliamentary constituencies in Humberside

Notes and references 

Parliamentary constituencies in Yorkshire and the Humber (historic)
Constituencies of the Parliament of the United Kingdom established in 1983
Constituencies of the Parliament of the United Kingdom disestablished in 1997